The Gathering Storm may refer to:

 The Gathering Storm, the first volume of Sir Winston Churchill's The Second World War
 The Gathering Storm (1974 film), a television film about Churchill, starring Richard Burton
 The Gathering Storm (2002 film), a television film about Churchill, starring Albert Finney
 Heroes of Might and Magic IV: The Gathering Storm, an expansion pack for the turn-based strategy game
 "The Gathering Storm", a BattleTech: The Animated Series episode
 "Chapter 4: The Gathering Storm", an episode of The Book of Boba Fett
 The Gathering Storm (novel), a fantasy novel by Robert Jordan and Brandon Sanderson
 Resistance: The Gathering Storm, the official novel of the PlayStation videogame Resistance: Fall of Man
 The Gathering Storm, a fantasy novel in the Crown of Stars series by Kate Elliott
 "Gathering Storm" (advertisement), 2009 video advertisement in opposition to same-sex marriage
 Civilization VI: Gathering Storm, 2019 expansion pack for Civilization VI
 Starshatter: The Gathering Storm, 2004 video game